I Nuovi Angeli ("The New Angels") are an Italian pop band formed in 1966 in Milan. The name refers to the eponymous drama film directed by Ugo Gregoretti in 1962.

Biography 
I Nuovi Angeli formed in 1966 from the merging of two bands – Paki & Paki (a pop duo formed in Milan by Pasquale Canzi and Pasquale Andriola) and an instrumental trio from Alessandria consisting in Alberto Pasetti (bass), Renato Sabbioni (guitar) and Franco Verde (drums). The band, initially called Paki & Paki and I Nuovi Angeli, achieved some success when their first single, L'ora più lunga (1966), who was adopted as the opening theme for the RAI TV show "La fiera dei sogni" hosted by Mike Bongiorno.

In 1967 Andriola and Verde left the project due to creative differences, and the band was simply renamed I Nuovi Angeli. Augmented by The New Dada former drummer Riki Rebaioli and lead singer Alfredo Gatti, I Nuovi Angeli recorded two more singles characterized by a beat production. In the late 1960s, following the departure of Gatti, the group replaced Rebaioli with Mauro Paoluzzi and left Durium Records to sign with Polygram. The move coincided with a change of musical direction, with the band turning towards the bubblegum genre.

The classic line-up of I Nuovi Angeli peaked in the early 1970s, thanks to a string of top-ten hits written by Renato Pareti and Roberto Vecchioni, including Donna Felicità  (1971), Uakadi Uakadù (1971), Singapore (1972) and Anna da dimenticare (1973). In 1971 I Nuovi Angeli embarked on a North-American tour and made their first TV appearance in America on the Ed Sullivan Show. In 1974 I Nuovi Angeli recorded Stasera Clown, a concept album in collaboration with the La Scala Orchestra revolving around the live of a group of circus artists.

With the advent of disco and punk music, I Nuovi Angeli experienced a decline in popularity. In 1978 Paoluzzi left the band to purchase a successful career as producer, songwriter session musician, collaborating with artists like Gianna Nannini and Patty Pravo. Sabbioni and Pasetti left the band a few months later and retired from the music industry. Canzi decided to continue with new musicians.

In 2005 the original members of I Nuovi Angeli met to discuss the possibility of a reunion. The band played a few warm-up gigs and recorded a double live album, "Il nostro concerto" but tragedy struck when Alberto Pasetti suddenly died at the age of 54. Following a legal battle between Sabbioni and Canzi over the property of the name I Nuovi Angeli, Canzi temporarily left the group. Despite numerous lineup changes, the band is still active.

Personnel

Current members 
Paki Canzi - piano, vocals (1966-2010 and 2014–present)
Aldo Valente - keyboards (1981-1985, 2015–present)
Vincenzo Mellace - drums (2017–present)
Antonio Allegro - guitar (2018–present)

Former members 
Renato Sabbioni - bass (1966-1978 and 2005-2014)
Alberto Pasetti - guitar (1966-1978 and 2005-2010, d. 2010)
Riki Rebaioli - drums (1966-1967)
Alfredo Gatti - vocals (1968-1969)
Mauro Paoluzzi - drums (1971-1978 and 2005-2010)
Valerio Liboni - drums (1978-2005 and 2010-2017)
Roger Riccobono - guitar (1978-1981)
Daniele Torchio - bass(1978-1984)
Alessandra Raya - vocals (1985-1991)
Matteo Galano - drums (1985-1998)
Antonio Dalicco - bass (1989-1998)
Dave Sumner - guitar (1990-1995)
Caterina De Francesco - vocals (1991-1996)
Susanna Dubaz - vocals (1996 -2001)
Sergio Vitali - guitar (1998-2001)
Fabio Nobile - drums (1998-2006)
Alvi Nobile - keyboards (1998-2006)
Mauro Mussoni - bass (2001-2006)
Valentina Ferri - vocals (2001-2009)
Silvano Borgatta - keyboards (2010-2014)
Marco Bonino - guitar (2017-2018)

Discography

Studio albums
 1969 - I Nuovi Angeli
 1969 - Un quarto di vita 
 1972 - Uakadi Uakadu
 1973 - Troppo bella per restare sola
 1973 - Anna da dimenticare
 1974 - Stasera Clown
 1976 - I Nuovi Angeli

Live albums
 1999 - Live
 2008 - Il nostro concerto (2 CD)
 2011 - DVD Live Show (also DVD)

Greatest Hits albums
 1990 - Voliamo ancora
 1995 - Una storia che continua
 2000 - Canta Italia
 2012 - C'è ancora posto in paradiso
 2016 - Tete à tete con i Nuovi Angeli

Selected singles
 1966 - L'ora più lunga
 1967 - Per vivere insieme
 1968 - Questo è un addio
 1969 - Ragazzina ragazzina
 1970 - Color cioccolata
 1971 - Donna Felicità
 1971 - Sole, buonanotte
 1971 - Uakadi Uakadù
 1972 - Un viaggio in Inghilterra
 1972 - Singapore
 1973 - La povera gente
 1973 - Anna da dimenticare
 1974 - Carovana
 1975 - Stanza dei miracoli
 1976 - Mamma luna
 1977 - Piccoli amanti
 1979 - Now
 1980 - Angelo Balù
 1984 - Io sto bene con te
 1987 - Voi del '96
 1988 - Soli soli
 1989 - Bella questa storia

Notes

References

External links

 
 

Musical groups established in 1966
Italian pop music groups
Italian rock music groups
Beat groups
1966 establishments in Italy
Musical groups from Milan